Mickael Marolany (born 13 April 1975 in Le Blanc-Mesnil, Seine-Saint-Denis) is a French former professional footballer who played as a full-back. He made 116 appearances in Ligue 2 for AS Beauvais Oise, CS Louhans-Cuiseaux and ES Wasquehal between 1992 and 2003.

References

1975 births
Living people
People from Le Blanc-Mesnil
Footballers from Seine-Saint-Denis
French footballers
Association football fullbacks
Ligue 2 players
Championnat National players
Championnat National 2 players
Championnat National 3 players
AS Beauvais Oise players
Louhans-Cuiseaux FC players
Wasquehal Football players